The 23rd Directors Guild of America Awards, honoring the outstanding directorial achievements in film and television in 1970, were presented in 1971.

Winners and nominees

Film

Television

External links
 

Directors Guild of America Awards
1970 film awards
1970 television awards
Direct
Direct
Directors